The Sydney Thunder are an Australian cricket club who play in the Big Bash League, the national domestic Twenty20 competition. The club was established in 2011 as an inaugural member of the eight-club league. The Big Bash League consists of a regular season and a finals series of the top five teams. This list includes players who have played at least one match for the Thunder in the Big Bash League.

Records

List of players 
Correct as of 25 March 2020.

Players are listed according to the date of their debut for the Thunder. All statistics are for Big Bash League only.

 The number to the left of player name represents 'cap'. For players who debuted for club in the same match, player caps are ordered by alphabetical order of last name.
 In category "Debut" games are listed as Tournament/Round. e.g. BBL02/8 would equate to 2012–13 Big Bash League, Sydney Thunder's 8th Match of the tournament.
 Hover over column headings for key

Source: ESPN Cricinfo Thunder Batting records and ESPN Cricinfo Thunder Bowling and Fielding records

See also 

 List of Big Bash League cricketers

References 

Sydney Thunder
Sydney Thunder
Sydney Thunder